The 2011–12 Southern Hemisphere tropical cyclone season may refer to one of three different basins and respective seasons:

2011-12 Australian region cyclone season, between 90°E and 160°E
2011-12 South Pacific cyclone season, east of 160°E

A South Atlantic tropical cyclone formed during this time period, Subtropical Storm Arani